Bere Alston or Beeralston was a parliamentary borough in Devon, which elected two Members of Parliament (MPs) to the House of Commons from 1584 until 1832, when the constituency was abolished by the Great Reform Act as a rotten borough.

History
Bere Alston was first summoned to return MPs in 1584; like many of the boroughs over the county boundary in Cornwall that were enfranchised during the reign of Elizabeth I, it had never been of much size and was a rotten borough from the start. Indeed, its first return of members specifically states that they had been elected at the request of The Marquess of Winchester and Lord Mountjoy, the chief landowners in the borough, and its enfranchisement plainly designed to allow them to nominate MPs.

The borough consisted of most of the village of Bere Alston in the parish of Bere Ferris, 10 miles north of Plymouth. By the time of the Great Reform Act there were 112 houses within the borough boundaries, and 139 in the whole village. The population was not separately recorded in the census. It was customary for elections to be conducted under a great tree in the centre of the village; there was no equivalent of a town hall, and indeed no municipal corporation.

Bere Alston was a burgage borough, the right to vote resting with the freehold tenants of a number of specified properties within the town of which there appears to have been only 30.  For much of the eighteenth century most, if not all, of these burgage properties were owned by the Drake and Hobart families (the latter becoming the Earls of Buckinghamshire in 1746). Only one contested election therefore occurred in the eighteenth century, when the two families failed to compromise. In the 1770s the borough was acquired by the 1st Duke of Northumberland, and was retained by his descendants until the borough was disenfranchised.

In the debates before the passing of the Reform Act, Bere Alston was held up as one of the most notorious examples of a rotten borough, vilified in more than one of the pro-Reform newspapers. The Times carried the following report of what happened in Bere Alston in the general election there in 1830:
 
"Dr Butler [the Portreeve, who was Returning Officer for the borough] ... met the voters under a great tree, the place usually chosen for the purpose of election. During the time the Portreeve was reading the acts of Parliament usually read on such occasions, one of the voters handed in to him a card containing the names of two candidates, proposed by himself and seconded by his friend. He was told ... this was too early. Before the reading was completed, the voter on the other side handed in a card corresponding with the former, which he was told was too late. The meeting broke up. The Portreeve and assistants adjourned to a public house in the neighbourhood, and then and there made a return of Lord Lovaine and Mr Blackett, which was not signed by a single person having a vote."

The election return actually bears seven signatures - individuals who were probably made temporary burgage holders to qualify as electors for the day of the election but none of whom probably resided in the borough. The two "voters" who sought to nominate candidates were probably unqualified but were actual residents. Otherwise the report is probably truthful.

The borough was disenfranchised by the Reform Act.

Members of Parliament

1584-1640

1640-1832

Election results

Elections in the 1830s

 Caused by Percy's succession to the peerage, becoming 5th Duke of Northumberland

Notes

References 

Robert Beatson, "A Chronological Register of Both Houses of Parliament" (London: Longman, Hurst, Res & Orme, 1807) 
 Michael Brock, The Great Reform Act (London: Hutchinson, 1973)
D Brunton & D H Pennington, Members of the Long Parliament (London: George Allen & Unwin, 1954)
Cobbett's Parliamentary history of England, from the Norman Conquest in 1066 to the year 1803 (London: Thomas Hansard, 1808) 
 J. E. Neale, The Elizabethan House of Commons (London: Jonathan Cape, 1949)
 T. H. B. Oldfield, The Representative History of Great Britain and Ireland (London: Baldwin, Cradock & Joy, 1816)
 J Holladay Philbin, Parliamentary Representation 1832 - England and Wales (New Haven: Yale University Press, 1965)

Parliamentary constituencies in Devon (historic)
Constituencies of the Parliament of the United Kingdom established in 1584
Constituencies of the Parliament of the United Kingdom disestablished in 1832
Rotten boroughs
Bere Ferrers